The Asia/Oceania Zone was one of the three zones of the regional Davis Cup men's tennis competition in 2016.

In the Asia/Oceania Zone there were four different tiers, called groups, in which teams competed against each other to advance to the upper tier. Winners in Group I advanced to the World Group play-offs, along with losing teams from the World Group first round. Teams who lost their respective ties competed in the relegation play-offs, with winning teams remaining in Group I, whereas teams who lost their play-offs were relegated to the Asia/Oceania Zone Group II in 2017.

Participating nations

Seeds: 
All seeds received a bye into the second round. 

 
 

Remaining nations:

Draw

 relegated to Group II in 2017.
 and  advance to World Group play-off.

First round

South Korea vs. New Zealand

Pakistan vs. China

Second round

India vs. South Korea

Uzbekistan vs. China

2nd Round relegation play-off

New Zealand vs. Pakistan

References

External links
Official Website

Asia/Oceania Zone Group I
Davis Cup Asia/Oceania Zone